The Little Salmon River is a tributary of the Salmon River in Idaho.

Course
From there, it flows north through the broad Meadows Valley past Meadows and New Meadows, where it receives Goose Creek from the right and Mud Creek from the left.

The river then enters a canyon, cutting across the western edge of the Salmon River Mountains, forming the boundary between Idaho County and Adams County. Most of the river runs parallel to US Highway 95.

Discharge

Geology and land use
The Little Salmon River formed as a result of a rift valley developing between the Rocky Mountains and the Columbia Plateau section of the Intermontane Plateaus. Columbia River basalts underlie much of the western and central parts of the watershed, while other types of volcanic rock of closer origin form the foundations of the eastern mountains. The entire watershed is dissected by fault-block rifting. The water table is high, and soils are generally well drained and of volcanic origin. 

The upper section of the watershed is a broad and low-gradient, sediment-floored valley used primarily for agriculture and ranching activities. It also has most of the basin's population. The rest of the river flows in a wild, deep, and narrow canyon mostly undeveloped with the exception of US Highway 95. Logging has also been a past activity in the valley, and tourism and fishing are growing industries. In a rare occurrence with rivers, the Little Salmon starts out in a developed, relatively flat area and flows through mountains further downstream, bearing some resemblance to the Klamath River, which also begins in an agricultural valley before cutting through mountains to the sea.

History
Historically, the Nez Perce, Shoshone and Bannock Native American tribes inhabited the watershed of the Little Salmon River. Their lifestyle depended on the river for salmon and on the surrounding lands for other animals, as well as precious natural minerals and resources that provided them with items to trade. Europeans introduced horses to the Bannock, who in turn spread their use to the Shoshones, allowing them to travel further and hunt buffalo and other big game. Settlers began arriving in the 1850s and established farms, ranches and towns. Communications to the outside world was limited until the construction of roads and railroads in the early 20th century. Despite that, the region has still remained relatively isolated.

The Payette National Forest and Nez Perce National Forest cover portions of the Little Salmon River watershed, but at no point does the river flow over federally protected lands. However, the river is also completely free flowing and unobstructed by dams or dikes. On higher mountain slopes rainfall can be up to  annually, and on the highest west-facing mountains, precipitation can be much higher than that. About half of the river is inhabited by namesake salmon, but at river mile 24.7 (river kilometer 39.8) Little Salmon Falls, at the confluence with Round Valley Creek, marks the end of the limit for anadromous fish. However, this barrier may have been different at some point in the past, because Native Americans have traditionally fished on the Little Salmon well upriver of the falls. Other than salmon, steelhead, Pacific lamprey, several different species of trout and dace, and other species of fish, are also present. Cottonwood, willow, dogwood and alder grow along the banks of the river.

Hydrology
Irrigation is now the primary water use in the Little Salmon River watershed. Although irrigated farmland lies all along the river, most of it is in the Meadows Valley and also in the watershed of Round Valley Creek, a major western tributary. Although no dams have been built on the river, there are three dams in the headwaters of Goose Creek, a major tributary of the river, to regulate flows for irrigation water.

Zoology
Little Salmon River is home to fish species such as Steelhead, Spring-Summer Chinook, and Rainbow Trout.The former two species are listed under the federal Endangered Species Act.

See also

 List of rivers of Idaho
 List of longest streams of Idaho
 List of tributaries of the Columbia River

References

External links

Rivers of Idaho
Rivers of Idaho County, Idaho
Rivers of Adams County, Idaho
Payette National Forest
Nez Perce National Forest
Tributaries of the Salmon River (Idaho)